Shurab-e Pain may refer to:
Shurab-e Pain, Fars
Shurab-e Pain, Fariman, Razavi Khorasan Province
Shurab-e Pain, Sarakhs, Razavi Khorasan Province